Wakefieldite-(Ce) is the cerium analogue of the uncommon rare-earth element vanadate mineral Wakefieldite. It is a member of the xenotime group.

Wakefieldite-(Ce) was first described in 1977. It was initially given the name kusuïte for its type locality in the Kusu deposit,  SW of Kinshasa, Zaire. In 1987 it was renamed as the Ce analog of wakefieldite-Y.

References

Cerium minerals
Vanadate minerals
Tetragonal minerals
Minerals in space group 141
Minerals described in 1977